Peter Barry Brown (13 July 1934 – 8 December 2011) was an English footballer who played as a forward for Southampton and Wrexham in the 1950s.

Football career
Brown was born in Andover, Hampshire and joined Southampton as a part-time professional in January 1952, while continuing his trade as a sign-writer. Later that year, he was called up for national service which he spent with the Royal Army Medical Corps (RAMC) at Crookham Camp, near Aldershot. He returned to Southampton in 1954, when he became a full-time professional, making his debut in the first team on 30 April 1954 at Norwich City. He played at outside-right in place of John Flood; the match ended in a 1–0 defeat, with Brown missing a chance to level the scores.

He spent most of his time at The Dell in the reserves, making three first team appearances at the end of the 1954–55 season, again as a replacement for Flood, with his first goal coming in a 5–3 victory at Colchester United on 30 April. Brown played the first five matches of the following season, scoring against Ipswich Town with a "splendid individual effort" on 24 August 1955; he then gave way to Flood before making a further four appearances towards the end of the season. With Terry Paine beginning to establish himself at outside-right, Brown's first team appearances became more infrequent and in July 1958 he was transferred to Wrexham.

He stayed with the Welsh club for two years, during which time he scored nine goals from 33 league appearances.

Later career
In 1960, he returned to Southampton, where he worked as a timekeeper in Southampton Docks, while continuing to play Non-League football with Poole Town, Dorchester Town and Andover.

He moved to Andover, where he worked for Test Valley Borough Council as a repairs inspector. He later owned the Cabin Café, in Bridge Street, Andover.

His son, Kevan was a trainee at Southampton before joining Brighton and Hove Albion in 1987, where he made 53 league appearances.

Peter Brown died in the Willow Court Nursing Home in Andover on 8 December 2011, following a long battle against Parkinson's disease.

References

1934 births
People from Andover, Hampshire
2011 deaths
English footballers
Association football wingers
Southampton F.C. players
Wrexham A.F.C. players
Poole Town F.C. players
Dorchester Town F.C. players
Andover F.C. players
English Football League players
Royal Army Medical Corps soldiers
Neurological disease deaths in England
Deaths from Parkinson's disease
Military personnel from Hampshire
20th-century British Army personnel